The Ontario Damsel Stakes is a Canadian Thoroughbred horse race run annually during the first week of July at Woodbine Racetrack in Toronto, Ontario. Restricted to three-year-old fillies who were foaled in the Province of Ontario, it is contested on Turf over a distance of one mile (8 furlongs).

Since inception it has been contested at:
 6.5 furlongs: 1979–1993, 1995–2009
 7 furlongs: 1994 (at Fort Erie Racetrack)
 8 furlongs: beginning in 2010

Recent winners

References
 The 2009 Ontario Damsel Stakes at Woodbine Entertainment Group

Turf races in Canada
Restricted stakes races in Canada
Flat horse races for three-year-old fillies
Woodbine Racetrack
Recurring sporting events established in 1979
1979 establishments in Ontario